Lionel Charles Upton (3 October 1924 – 21 February 2019) was an Australian rules footballer who played with North Melbourne in the Victorian Football League (VFL).

Notes

External links 

2019 deaths
1924 births
Australian rules footballers from Victoria (Australia)
North Melbourne Football Club players
Brunswick Football Club players